The Pothippu is one of the sub-sections of Arul Nool, which was the secondary scripture of Ayyavazhi. It is a form of prayer called 'Mappu Kettal'. The author of the content is unknown.

 
 

Ayyavazhi texts